Wasim Jaffer  (born 16 February 1978) is an Indian retired professional cricketer. He was a right-handed opening batsman and an occasional right arm off-break bowler. He is currently the highest run-scorer in Ranji Trophy cricket, surpassing Amol Muzumdar. In November 2018, he became the first batsman to score 11,000 runs in the competition. In January 2019, he became the most capped player in Ranji Trophy history with appearance of his 146th match surpassing Madhya Pradesh's Devendra Bundela (145). He was appointed as batting coach for Bangladesh cricket team. In March 2020, he announced his retirement from all forms of cricket.

In June 2020, Jaffer was announced as the head coach of Uttarakhand for 2020–21 season. Citing "interference and bias" in the team selection, he stepped down in February 2021. In July 2021, he was appointed as head coach of Odisha for two years. Wasim Jaffer became Bangladesh U-19 cricket team's batting consultant.

Early years
Following a prolific school career, including an innings of 400 not out as a 15-year-old, he made his entry into the first-class cricket and scored a triple-century in his second match. This innings of 314 not out helped set a series of firsts for Mumbai. It was the first occasion that a batsman had made a triple century for Mumbai away from home and, in putting on 459 runs with his opening partner Sulakshan Kulkarni, the pair became the first from Mumbai to pass 400. The Indian Express wrote, "Such was his temperament during the 675 minute stay that it was hard to believe he was playing only his second match. What was more praiseworthy was the youngster's ability to find gaps at will."

Domestic career
Jaffer represented Scholes CC in the Huddersfield Drakes League for a number of seasons as their overseas player. For the 2010 season he moved a few miles down the road to Skelmanthorpe Cricket Club, and broke the league record for runs scored in a single season. In the 2011 season Jaffer signed to Himley CC in the Birmingham and District Premier League.

In his Test career so far, Jaffer has five centuries of which two were double-centuries. He has Test centuries against Pakistan, England, West Indies and South Africa.

As of the 2013 season Wasim Jaffer travelled to England where he played for Ainsdale CC in the LDCC league. Here he enjoyed a successful first half of the season scoring multiple centuries and a had a strike rate of 97.93 and a top score of 153 not out. Injury curtailed his time at Ainsdale as he had to return home to India for an operation on his knee.

In June 2015, Jaffer switched to Vidarbha from 2015/16 Ranji season. On 1 January 2018, Vidarbha won Ranji Trophy and in the final against Delhi, Jaffer hit the winning boundary.

In November 2018, in the third round of the 2018–19 Ranji Trophy against Baroda, Jaffar became the first batsman to score 11,000 runs in the Ranji Trophy. The following month, in round seven of the tournament, he scored his 55th century in first-class cricket. Later the same month, he equalled the record for playing in the most matches in the Ranji Trophy, with 145. He was the leading run-scorer for Vidarbha in the group-stage of the 2018–19 Ranji Trophy, with 763 runs in eight matches. In the quarter-final match of the tournament, against Uttarakhand, he scored his 19,000th run in first-class cricket.

In the opening round of the 2019–20 Ranji Trophy, Jaffer became the first cricketer to play in 150 matches in the Ranji Trophy. On 7 March 2020, Jaffer retired from all formats of the game.

International career

An opening batsman, with the style of Mohammed Azharuddin, much was expected of Jaffer as he entered Test cricket for in a home series against South Africa in 2000. However, the experienced bowlers Shaun Pollock and Allan Donald proved too difficult for him to cope with, and he managed just 46 runs from his four innings. He would not start another international match for some time, eventually returning in May 2002 for a tour of the West Indies. Jaffer had a respectable series, making 51 in Bridgetown and 86 at Antigua. He had done enough to be included in the Indian squad for their tour of England the following summer but, despite a half century at Lord's, he struggled in his other innings and was dropped after two Tests.

Jaffer was recalled to the Test squad for the tour of Pakistan 2005–06 in the wake of excellent domestic form, but did not play in the Tests. It was in the next series in India that Jaffer scored his maiden Test century: exactly 100 against England at Nagpur, in his first Test since his recall.

He made his first Test double-century at the Antigua Recreation Ground against the West Indies in June 2006. His 212 was made in over 500 minutes during the second innings was the equal second highest by an Indian batsman in the Caribbean.

In July 2006, his position as India's first-choice opener with partner Virender Sehwag was confirmed via the award of a central contract (Grade C) by the Board of Control for Cricket in India.

Jaffer's ODI debut came in November 2006 against South Africa but he was unproductive and was immediately dropped. However, he continued to score in the Test format, making his third Test century against South Africa at Newlands.

Despite making a pair in the opening Test of his next series against Bangladesh at Chittagong, he returned to form with 138 in the following Test before retiring hurt.

Jaffer scored 202 in the first innings of the second Test of the 2007 series against Pakistan at Eden Gardens, Kolkata.

Coaching career
He was appointed as batting coach for Bangladesh cricket team

He was appointed as batting coach for Kings XI Punjab

He was appointed as head coach for Uttarakhand cricket team

He was appointed as head coach for Odisha cricket team

Controversy
Wasim Jaffer resigned as head coach of Uttarakhand cricket team in January 2021 alleging selection bias by officials. In response, he was accused by the Uttarakhand Cricket Association of promoting Muslim players in the team and bringing in maulvis inside the dressing room for religious prayers - allegations which he denied, following which a number of cricketers came out in support for him.

References

External links

 

1978 births
Living people
Indian cricketers
India Test cricketers
India One Day International cricketers
Indian Muslims
Mumbai cricketers
Vidarbha cricketers
Royal Challengers Bangalore cricketers
West Zone cricketers
India Green cricketers
India Blue cricketers
Abahani Limited cricketers